Angel's Friends is an Italian comic series created by Simona Ferri that debuted in March 2007. On 12 October 2009, an animated series of the same name premiered on Italia 1. A second season of 52 episodes was announced in January 2011 and premiered in Russia on 29 April 2012.

A television film, Angel's Friends – Tra Sogno e Realtà (Angel's Friends: Between Dream and Reality), premiered on 23 April 2011.

In the United States, the show is available via NBC, syndication and many local stations air the program on their secondary subchannel service to fulfill FCC mandates (at least three hours of E/I related material per week). The second season, dubbed in English, French and Russian, has been uploaded to YouTube by Mondo TV in September 2014.

A live-action adaptation of the animated series (either a TV series or a movie) is in talks. A teaser pilot titled Darkly was produced in 2016 by Play Entertainment and Mad Rocket Entertainment, adapted by Daniele Cosci and directed by Alessio Liguori, with Alessandro Danzi as Sulfus, Demetra Bellina as Raf and Denise Tantucci as Reina. The plot is aimed to an older audience and follows a darker storyline, where Raf and Sulfus are killed by Reina and reborn as humans without memories.

Plot
Four Angels (Raf, Uri, Sweet and Miki) and four Devils/Demons (Sulfus, Cabiria, Kabale and Gas) are sent to Earth, in an unused area of the Golden School, where they learn everything they need to become Guardian Angels and Guardian Devils. The Angels and Devils are required to form pairs as part of their education, each of which will have to deal with a human being, known as Earthly Ones, and help them choose between the right and wrong way in life without being discovered. Angels and Devils cannot operate at the same time, so they decide, clashing in the Challenge Room, who will work first. Moreover, they are subject to the V.E.T.O. (Vetoed from Exposing, Touching or Obstructing/Overhearing in the comic – ).

Comic plot
While the Angels and Devils are attending their stage on Earth, the planet is threatened by ancient creatures, the Reliveds, led by a mysterious man called Maliki. He was a Devil who gave up his eternal life because he loved a human woman, named Vera. When she left him, he decided to take revenge on all Angels, Devils and humans. As a result, the Angels and Devils form an alliance to fight against him.

Cartoon plot

First season
The evil Neutral One Reina, imprisoned in the Limbo with her slave Maliki, wants to take revenge of Angels and Devils who confined her. To get free, a sacrilege is necessary: because of this, she exploits the rising feelings between Raf, an Angel, and Sulfus, a Devil, forcing them to kiss. The sacrilege breaks the chains and Reina, once free, tells the truth about her origins to Raf: she was born a Terrestrial, not an angel and was adopted by the High Spheres when her parents, two powerful sovereigns, died during the struggle between Angels and Devils. Reina persuades Raf to enter in the Hall of Portraits to see her parents' faces: while Raf is in, Reina steals all of the portraits to control the Earthly One's will. At the end of the first season, using the Prism Fly ability, Raf manages to defeat Reina. Raf discovers that her real father is Maliki, who sacrifices himself to save her, while her mother is imprisoned somewhere in an endless slumber.

Second season
After the Summer vacations, Angels and Devils return to the Golden School to begin the second year of their stage, their new Earthly Ones are given to them. Meanwhile, Sulfus is blackmailed by two masked Eternals who hold in their possession Raf's mother: Angelie. In order to make sure Sulfus does not try to escape their control, a mysterious girl: Blue, watches over him. Raf and Sulfus' love is highly tested with the appearance of these new enemies and more mysteries about Raf's past are revealed. At the end of the second season, Raf and Sulfus learn that the School's Angel principal and also angelic army general, Cassidy, and Devil principal and also demonic army general, Kubral, manipulated them in order to destroy the V.E.T.O.'s scales and wage war against each other. The season ends on a cliffhanger of Blue, the princess of Limbo, who goes back to Limbo with what she wanted by the two Golden School's principals and frees Reina. Although there is no sign of a season 3 in the works.

Differences between comic and cartoon
 In the comic, the main characters are younger: in fact, while in the cartoon, they are the same age as Raf (15 "stars", as for the Angels, or "flashes", as for the Devils), in the comic, Raf is 12, Uri is 11 and Miki is 9; Sulfus is 13, Kabale and Gas are 10, Cabiria is 11.
 Sweet (whose original Italian name is Dolce), Misha and Reina don't appear in the comic, while the Angel Ang-Lì, the Devil Mephisto, and Raoul, the Earthly one loved by Raf, aren't shown in the cartoon.
 In the comic, the hobbies of Angels and Devils are shown, while in the cartoon, they are not. For example, Raf is keen on ecological remedies, such as beauty masks and infusions, Miki is a music expert, Kabale loves chemistry, alchemy and numerology. Cabiria likes films, cartoons and comics and she's a director and an illustrator. Gabe is a genius of technology and uses a handheld.
 In the comic, Angels are part of a funk band, in which Raf is the vocalist, Gabe plays the keyboard, Miki the bass, Uri the drums and Ang-Lì the sax. The Devils have their own rock band: Sulfus plays the bass, Kabale the electric guitar, Cabiria the drums, Gas the keyboard and Mephisto is the vocalist.
 In the comic, Miki is repeating the school year because she tried to heal her Earthly one, breaking the V.E.T.O. Sulfus behaves like a seducer, which doesn't happen in the cartoon.
 The character design of the cartoon is far different than that of the comic.
 In the comic, Arkhan and Temptel don't teach "positive Earthly life" and "negative Earthly life", but "positive Earthly infancy" and "negative Earthly infancy", as the characters are younger.

Characters

Places
Angie Town
Angels' city, it's a peaceful town located in the Paradise. It's ruled by the High Spheres, whose messengers are the seraphims.

Sulfur City
Devils' city, it's a chaotic place, located in Hell. It's ruled by the Low Spheres, whose messengers are the malebolge. Also called "Match City".

Earthly city
It's the city where the Earthly ones live. Its name is unknown, but it looks like European metropolis.

Golden School
It's the school where the Earthly ones study, an old building located in the Earthly city. In an unused area, Angels and Devils attend their classes. In the middle, there is the Central Ala, where classrooms are located; in the same hallway, there's the Challenge Room, where Angels and Devils clashes. In the tower there are the Dreaming Rooms, Angels' dormitories, while underground there are the Incubators, Devils' dormitories.

Heaven

Hell

Mistery House
Reina and Maliki's house after leaving the Limbo. Previously, it was Raf's family's house.

Limbo
It's the place where Reina was imprisoned since her exile, a place outside the control of both the High and Low Spheres. Only a sacrilege between an Angel and a Devil is powerful enough to break the wall of the prison. Maliki also lives here with his mistress, but he's allowed to go to the real world.

Path of Metamorphosis
A legendary path, rich in trials and obstacles, which, if passed, would allow Angels or Devils to become human. Tyco and Sai decided to try it, but after reaching the end, they didn't manage to transform and were obliged to separate. In it, the Sigh of Deception (or Wind of Metamorphosis) blows: it's a powerful wind that inhibits reasons and pulls humans, Angels and Devils to act impulsively. The Path of Metamorphosis appears for the first time in the movie Between Dream and Reality. At the end of the second season, Raf and Sulfus made the decision to walk the path together.

Sunny College
It's the place where the Angels and Devils went to take summer classes together. They were taught about Earthly Acting.

Princess Theater
While the Angels and Devils were taking summer courses the Earthly Ones were assigned to perform a play at a nearby abandoned theater. The theater was closed down because Tyco didn't want to see plays that reminded him of his feelings for Sai.

Episodes 
The cartoon is produced by R.T.I., Mondo TV and Play Entertainment, directed by Orlando Corradi and written by Francesco Arlanch and Francesco Balletta. However, the first one who realized the cartoon (26 episodes lasting 20 minutes each) was the Italian company Stranemani, but during the comic festival in Cannes, the version by Mondo TV was chosen, despite the Stranemani version using the same character designs from the comic.

First season (2009–2010) 
In Italy, Mondo Home Entertainment released the first season in ten DVDs, starting in November 2009. DVDs were also sold in Czech Republic (8 DVDs titled Andílci) and Russia (6 DVDs).

Second season

Film 
A television movie based on the animated series and settled between the first and the second season aired, in Italy, on 23 April 2011. The movie focuses on the Angels attending the Summer School at the Sunny College in Alpinville, where Raf hopes she will not meet Sulfus. The Devils show up at the school and Raf tells Sulfus she has fallen in love with someone else. Meanwhile, the Earthly ones receive the task of refurbishing the Theatre of Princes and organising a play, Romeo & Juliet by William Shakespeare. However, they are attacked by a mysterious hooded man who wants them to leave the theatre. The Angels and the Devils decide to investigate and find out the truth about Tyco and Sai's fate. At last, Raf and Sulfus conclude that they'll decide what to do about their future together once returned to the Golden School for the new term.

CD 
On 2 November 2010, a CD dedicated to Angel's Friends was released. The album, produced by Mediaset record company, contains the full Italian opening theme performed by Cristina D'Avena and several songs named after the characters of the series, 11 songs totally. The tracks are in English, but the opening theme.

Angel's Friends – Cristina D'Avena
Cabiria – Kate Kelly
Kabalè – Gabriella Vainiglia
Malachia – Silvio Pozzoli
Gas – Antonio Divincenzo
Miki – Maria Concetta Montesano
Raf – Gisella Cozzo
Sulfus – Mark Evans
Reina – Jacobs Sewit Villa
Dolce – Fabiana Vitellio
Uriè – Barbara Comi

International broadcast 
Angel's Friends was distributed all over the world, in countries like Spain, Portugal, Latin America, Belgium, Luxembourg, Bulgaria, Czech Republic, Slovakia, Ex-Yugoslavia. As of April 2010, the license has been sold in 37 countries.

Publications

Comic 

The monthly publication of the comic Angel's Friends by Play Press began in March 2007. The printed version was edited by Red Whale and Yellow Whale, scripted by Bruno Enna and drawn by Giada Perissinotto. The publication was discontinued in January 2008 with the release of Chapter 14, A Spark in the Heart.

A second version of the comic, based on the cartoon, was published bimonthly by Preziosi Collection since 2009, in Angel's Friends Magazine. It was discontinued after the release of No. 4.

Chapters of Play Press comic 
 The Eternal Day
 The Watcher
 Only Two Steps
 A Tiny Evil
 Angels' City
 Sulfus's Shadow
 The Neutralmancer
 Secret-Blurter
 The Guardian
 Never More Together
 The Other Side of Love
 The Susceptible Point
 Between Dream and Reality
 A Spark in the Heart

Chapters of Preziosi comic 
 Chasing the wind
 Unsaid things
 The storm
 Between Good and Evil

Books

Novels

Reception 
In Italy, the first season got an average share of 8.2%, sometimes reaching 11%.

References

External links
  
 Angel's Friends on Mondo TV website
 

Italian comics titles
Comics adapted into animated series
Comics adapted into television series
Television shows based on comics
2000s Italian television series
2010s Italian television series
2000s animated television series
2010s animated television series
Italian children's animated fantasy television series
Italian flash animated television series
2009 Italian television series debuts
2010 Italian television series endings
Anime-influenced Western animated television series
Fictional angels
Fictional demons and devils
Fashion dolls
Television series about angels
Television series about demons